MPPC can refer to:

 The Motion Picture Prop Company
 Motion Picture Patents Company
 Microsoft Point-to-Point Compression
 Menlo Park Presbyterian Church
 Milk Sphingomyelin (1-Myristoyl,2-Palmitoyl-sn-Glycero 3-PhosphoCholine)
 Multi-pixel photon counter or silicon photomultiplier